The Coca-Cola Building is a Coca-Cola bottling plant modeled as a Streamline Moderne building designed by architect Robert V. Derrah with the appearance of a ship with portholes, catwalk and a bridge from five existing industrial buildings in 1939. It is located at 1334 South Central Avenue in Los Angeles, California. It was designated Los Angeles Historic-Cultural Monument Number 138 on 5 Feb 1975. It is often referred to as the Coke Building.

See also
List of Los Angeles Historic-Cultural Monuments in Downtown Los Angeles

Notes

References
Marian Moffett, Michael W. Fazio, Lawrence Wodehouse. A world history of architecture. McGraw-Hill Professional, 2003. , . Coca-Cola Bottling Plant in Chapter 15 Art Deco, page 499 and Figure 15.42. Google books

External links
No. 138 - Coca-Cola Building. Big Orange Landmarks. Exploring the Landmarks of Los Angeles, One Monument at a Time. Several external views plus one interior picture.

Los Angeles
Buildings and structures in Downtown Los Angeles
Los Angeles Historic-Cultural Monuments
Industrial buildings completed in 1939
1939 establishments in California
1930s architecture in the United States
Streamline Moderne architecture in California